The 1968 Campeonato Ecuatoriano de Fútbol Serie A, the first division of Ecuadorian football (soccer), was played by 12 teams. The champion was Deportivo Quito.

First stage

Liguilla No Descenso

Liguilla Final

External links
 Ecuador 1968 

1968
Ecu
Football